Husein Aidid (born 1913) was an Indonesian songwriter, singer and entrepreneur. Aidid was the founder and leader of the Orkes Gambus al-Usysyaaq (founded in 1947) which later became transformed into the Orkes Melayu Kenangan in 1950. Together with his new Malay Orchestra, on October 26, 1950, Aidid began its first broadcast on Radio Republik Indonesia and was broadcast nationally. At that time, RRI was the most popular entertainment facilities of society.

Aidid died in September 13, 1965.

Biography

Early life
Aidid was born in an Arab village in Pekojan, West Jakarta in 1913. He came from the family of Ba 'Alawi sada of Arab Hadhrami descent surnamed Aidid, his father was Alwi bin Abubakar Aidid, while his mother was a Betawi girl named Fatimah. He studied at Kampong Djawa-Batavia Centrum School, majoring in Metalworking.

Personal life
Aidid married a Betawi girl named Saodah and had  six children, three boys and three girls. They are Alwi Husein Aidid, Fatmah Husein Aidid, Faisyi Husein Aidid, Abubakar Husein Aidid, Farhana Husein Aidid, and Hamid Husein Aidid.

Career

Early career
Since young, Aidid has been wrestling with the music world. He studied music to Sardi, the father of a legendary violinist Idris Sardi. The instruments he used to play were piano and violin. With his piano he could create and orchestrate a song, then poured in a special music book.

Gambus orchestra
In 1947, Aidid along with other Pekojan youths founded a gambus orchestra named al-Usysyaaq, with Aidid as its leader. Although at the beginning of the emergence of this gambus orchestra has not been able to penetrate Radio Republik Indonesia, but the performance of the gambus orchestra unexpectedly got a good response from the people of Jakarta who, at that time, were fond of the Malay rhythmic songs, like qanbūs music.

References

Bibliography

 
 
 
 
 

1913 births
1965 deaths
Indonesian people of Yemeni descent
Indonesian songwriters